The Mooney M22 Mustang is the first attempt at a pressurized single engine aircraft by the Mooney Aircraft Company of the United States.

Development
The Mustang was developed to be a top-of-the-line model to supplement Mooney's successful Mooney M20 high-performance light aircraft. It is a five-seat pressurized single-engined aircraft with a wider and longer fuselage than the M20E Super 21 and a taller fin and leading edge fillet. It is a low-winged monoplane with a retractable nosewheel undercarriage, with a similar wing to that used on Mooney's earlier M20 Ranger.

The first prototype flew on September 24, 1964, with the type being certified on September 26, 1966. First deliveries commenced in 1965, continuing until 1970. 36 aircraft were completed before the line was closed. It was produced and sold at a loss, which contributed to the bankruptcy of Mooney.

The "Mark 22" name had previously been applied to a 1957 Mooney M20 experimental aircraft built with twin engines, a nose cone, and an enlarged tail surface. That aircraft did not go into production.

Operational history
The Model 22, although produced in fairly small numbers, has been operated by private and commercial owners in several countries including the United States and Australia. As a demonstration of its high performance, the second production aircraft was flown non-stop from New York to the Paris Air Show in June 1967, the flight taking 13 hours 10 minutes. The achievement is recorded on the display board in the accompanying photograph. The aircraft had been fitted with an extra fuel tank for the flight. In 2001, 24 aircraft remained in service.

Specifications (M22)

References

Bibliography
 
 
 
 
 

1960s United States civil utility aircraft
Mustang
Low-wing aircraft
Single-engined tractor aircraft
Aircraft first flown in 1964